The International Networking Working Group (INWG) was a group of prominent computer science researchers in the 1970s who studied and developed standards and protocols for computer networking. Set up in 1972 as an informal group to consider the technical issues involved in connecting different networks, its charter was to develop international standard protocols for internetworking. INWG became a subcommittee of the International Federation for Information Processing (IFIP) two years later. Concepts developed by members of the group contributed to the original "Protocol for Packet Network Intercommunication" proposed by Vint Cerf and  Bob Kahn in 1974 and the Transmission Control Protocol and Internet Protocol (TCP/IP) that emerged later.

History 
The International Networking Working Group formed in October 1972 at the International Conference on Computer Communication held in Washington D.C. Its purpose was to study and develop "international standard protocols for internetworking". The group was modelled on the ARPANET "Networking Working Group" created by Steve Crocker. 

Vint Cerf was the first Chair of the INWG. Other active members included Alex McKenzie, Donald Davies, Roger Scantlebury, Louis Pouzin and Hubert Zimmermann. These researchers represented the American ARPANET, the French CYCLADES project, and the British team working on the NPL network and European Informatics Network. In January 1974 Pouzin arranged affiliation with the International Federation for Information Processing (IFIP). INWG became IFIP Working Group 1 under Technical Committee 6 (Data Communication) with the title "International Packet Switching for Computer Sharing" (WG6.1). This standing, although informal, enabled the group to provide technical input on packet networking to CCITT and ISO.

In September 1973, Vint Cerf and Bob Kahn (who was not a member of INWG) gave a paper at an INWG meeting at the University of Sussex in England. Their ideas were refined further in long discussions with Davies, Scantlebury, Pouzin and Zimmerman. Louis Pouzin introduced the term catenet, the original term for an interconnected network, in October 1973. Zimmerman published a paper "Standard host-host protocol for heterogeneous computer networks" in April 1974, and Pouzin published a May 1974 paper "A Proposal for Interconnecting Packet Switching Networks". Kahn and Vint Cerf also published their proposal in May 1974, "A Protocol for Packet Network Intercommunication", which introduced the term internet as a shorthand for internetwork. The paper acknowledged several members of the INWG.Over three years, the group shared numerous numbered 'notes'. There were two competing proposals, INWG 37 based on the early Transmission Control Program proposed by Kahn and Cerf (updated in INWG 72), and INWG 61 based on the CYCLADES TS (transport station) protocol proposed by Pouzin and Zimmermann. There were two sticking points (how fragmentation should work; and whether the data flow was an undifferentiated stream or maintained the integrity of the units sent). These were not major differences and after "hot debate" a synthesis was proposed in INWG 96.
This protocol, agreed by the group in 1975, titled "Proposal for an international end to end protocol", was written by Vint Cerf, Alex McKenzie, Roger Scantlebury, and Hubert Zimmermann. It was presented to the CCIT in 1976 by Derek Barber, who became INWG chair earlier that year. Although the protocol was adopted by networks in Europe, it was not adopted by the CCIT nor by the ARPANET. 

CCIT went on to adopt the X.25 standard in 1976, based on virtual circuits, and ARPA ultimately developed the Internet protocol suite, including the Internet Protocol as connectionless layer and the Transmission Control Protocol as a reliable connection-oriented service, which incorporated concepts from the French CYCLADES project. 

Alex McKenzie served as chair from 1979-1982 and Secretary beginning in 1983. Later international work led to the OSI model in 1984, of which many members of the INWG became advocates. During the 'Protocol Wars' of the late 1980s and early 1990s, engineers, organizations and nations became polarized over the issue of which standard, the OSI model or the Internet protocol suite would result in the best and most robust computer networks. ARPA partnerships with the telecommunication and computer industry led to widespread private sector adoption of the Internet protocol suite as a communication protocol.

The INWG continued to work on protocol design and formal specification until the 1990s when it disbanded as the Internet grew rapidly. Nonetheless, issues with the Internet Protocol suite remain and alternatives have been proposed building on INWG ideas such as Recursive Internetwork Architecture.

Members 
The group had about 100 members, including the following:

 D. Barber
 B. Barker
 V. Cerf
 W. Clipsham
 D. Davies
 R. Despres
 V. Detwiler
 F. Heart
 A. McKenzie
 L. Pouzin
 O. Riml
 K. Samuelson
 K. Sandum
R. Scantlebury
 B. Sexton
 P. Shanks
 C.D. Shepard
 J. Tucker
 B. Wessler
H. Zimmerman

See also
 Coloured Book protocols
 History of the Internet
Protocol Wars
Public data network

Notes

References

Further reading

External links 

 International Packet Network Working Group (INWG) , Charles Babbage Institute Archives, University of Minnesota Archival Collection

Communications protocols
Network protocols